Hong Duc University|HDU (CN:洪德大学 |FR:Université Hong Duc) is a public university in Vietnam, located in Thanh Hoa city, near Lam Son high school and Sam Son beach.

Formation
The university was established on September 24, 1997 according to Decision No. 797/1997/QD-TTg issued by the Prime Minister (This university is named after the era name of the most prosperous emperor in the whole history of the nation: Lê Thánh Tông), on the basis of merging three colleges: College of Education, College of Economics - Technology, Medical College of Thanh Hoa. Hong Duc University is the first university in the Vietnamese higher education system to be established under a new model: a public, multi-disciplinary university, under the supervision of the People's Committee of Thanh Hoa province, under Quality management of the Ministry of Education and Training.

Hong Duc University is focused on providing high-quality education in various fields including engineering, economics, law, and more. The university has a reputation for offering innovative programs and utilizing modern teaching methods to enhance the student experience. In addition to its academic programs, Hong Duc University also places a strong emphasis on research and community engagement. The university has established partnerships with various organizations and businesses in order to provide its students with practical, real-world experience and help bridge the gap between education and industry.

Overall, Hong Duc University is known for its commitment to producing well-rounded graduates who are prepared for successful careers and prepared to make a positive impact on their communities.

Hong Duc University is an application-oriented school serving socio-economic goals, typical products: Hong Duc 9 rice type, HDBT hydroelectric pump, Environmental treatment technology, Trico-HDU product set, Multi-function smart hospital bed, durable unburnt bricks, intelligent telecommunication station control system...

Strategic objective: To build Hong Duc University into a smart university, a center for training, scientific research, technology transfer and innovation; integration with advanced universities in ASEAN and the world.

Infrastructure
After 3 stages of investment and construction, up to now, the facilities for professional activities of the University have been quite complete and modern.
With a total area of 478,000 m2, of which the main campus is 384,000m2 and the Center for Defense and Security Education 94,000m2, Hong Duc University is one of the higher education institutions with a spacious campus, currently modern, green, clean, beautiful and safest environment among universities in the country. Dormitories, sports complexes, library, lecture halls, and laboratories are synchronously and modernly invested with equipment to meet training, scientific research and other activities.

Academic Program
The University's organization currently consists of 33 affiliated units, including: 12 training faculties; 10 Offices; 3 Boards; 7 Centers and medical stations.

The school currently has nearly 740 staff and lecturers, of which permanent lecturers have 02 professors, 24 associate professors, 152 doctorates - accounting for more than 32% of teachers with doctorate degrees. Many excellent PhDs from advanced countries.

The school diversified forms of cooperation with prestigious schools, institutes and organizations in the world, bringing prosperity to international cooperation activities. Typically, there are cooperation programs with world-renowned universities: University of Zielona Góra (Poland), Greifswald University and Anhalt University of Applied Sciences (Germany), Soongsil University(Korea)...Implement scientific research cooperation with universities: University of Greifswald (Germany), Aix-Marseille University...

In the past years, lecturers of the University have implemented 02 international projects, 08 State-level projects, including 02 independent projects and 06 projects under the National Science and Technology Development Fund (NAFOSTED); 38 ministerial-level projects, 56 provincial-level projects and 533 grassroots-level projects. Published 1,329 scientific research works in domestic and international specialized scientific journals. Implemented 1,942 student scientific research projects, of which 328 were awarded university-level prizes and 32 ministerial-level projects, and 04 Vietnam technical innovation awards ( VIFOTEC). Students of the University joined the Provincial Athlete's Delegation to attend the National Sports Congress, the Southeast Asian Championship won many medals, including 16 gold, silver and bronze medals in Taekwondo, Vovinam, Sepak takraw, Wushu, Kickboxing, Muay.

International Cooperation

Future Vision
In 2037, Hong Duc University would be ranked among the first-rate universities of the nation; a bright application-oriented university in ASEAN.

Notable alumni

Extracurriculars
Miss University
Miss University is an annual event with the purpose of honoring the beauty of Vietnamese women and encouraging students to preserve and promote a model life.

Volunteer Activities
The Student Union of Hong Duc University holds many volunteer activities for students to join, such as teaching languages to orphans or helping new students with enrollment exams for residents. In addition, students can help people in poor villages during summer vacation.

References 

Universities in Vietnam